This is a list of flag bearers who have represented Lebanon at the Olympics.

Flag bearers carry the national flag of their country at the opening ceremony of the Olympic Games.

See also
Lebanon at the Olympics

References

Lebanon at the Olympics
Lebanon
Olympic flag bearers